Jagannathrao Joshi (23 June 1920 – 15 July 1991) was an Indian politician and a senior leader of the Bharatiya Jana Sangh (BJS) and Bharatiya Janata Party (BJP). 
 
He was born at Nargund, Karnataka in 23 June 1920.  He completed his matriculation from Nutan Marathi Vidyalaya in Pune and graduation in English Hons  from Sir Parshurambhau College. Inspired by the ideology of the Rashtriya Swayamsevak Sangh, he began his political career with the Jana Sangh in Pune.

Joshi was elected to the Lok Sabha twice from Madhya Pradesh as Jana Sangh member, in 1967 (from Bhopal) and 1971 (from Shajapur). Later, he served as a member of the Rajya Sabha from 1978 to 1984. He was BJP's candidate from Pune in 1984 Lok Sabha elections.

One of the tallest national political leaders of the RSS parivar and a well-respected orator, he actively participated in the Goa Liberation Movement. His contribution to building the BJS and BJP in Karnataka earned him the epithet "Karnataka Kesari" (Lion of Karnataka). He could deliver impeccable political speeches in several languages, such as Hindi, English, Kannada and Marathi, all of which languages he spoke with native fluency.  
 
Joshi died on 15 July 1991 at the age of 71.

A Government Primary School at Sanquelim in Goa is named in his honour.

References 

1920 births
1991 deaths
People from Gadag district
People from Maharashtra
India MPs 1967–1970
India MPs 1971–1977
Rajya Sabha members from Madhya Pradesh
Marathi politicians
Goa liberation activists
Lok Sabha members from Madhya Pradesh
People from Shajapur district
Bharatiya Jana Sangh politicians
Bharatiya Janata Party politicians from Madhya Pradesh
People from Bhopal district
Rajya Sabha members from the Bharatiya Janata Party